James Duckworth (born January 14, 1957) is an American blues guitarist. He was a member of Memphis group Tav Falco's Panther Burns alongside Alex Chilton in the early 1980s. He played with Charlie Pickett on the latter's Route 33 album, and was also a member of the Los Angeles punkabilly blues band The Gun Club joining in January 1983. He formed the Wallendas in 2006, is currently the lead guitarist for Buffalo Jack & The Parlor Snakes. In between bands, Duckworth did a lot of session work.

References

Living people
1957 births
American blues guitarists
American male guitarists
20th-century American guitarists
20th-century American male musicians
Tav Falco's Panther Burns members
The Gun Club members